Ormeniș River may refer to:
Ormeniș, a tributary to Mureș in Romania
Ormeniș, a tributary to Olt in Romania